This is a list of the top-selling singles in New Zealand for 2017 from the Official New Zealand Music Chart's end-of-year chart, compiled by Recorded Music NZ. Recorded Music NZ also published list of the top 20 singles released by New Zealand artists for the same time period.

Chart 
Key
 – Song of New Zealand origin

Top 20 singles by New Zealand artists

Notes

References 

2017 in New Zealand music
2017 record charts
Singles 2017